Kenneth Jørgensen (born July 17, 1976) is a Danish handballer, currently playing for Danish Handball League side Fredericia HK. He has previously played for league rivals KIF Kolding.

External links
 Player info

1976 births
Living people
Danish male handball players
People from Middelfart Municipality
Sportspeople from the Region of Southern Denmark